Gilli was an eleventh-century Hebridean chieftain whose career coincided with an era of Orcadian overlordship in the Kingdom of the Isles. According to mediaeval saga-tradition, Gilli was a brother-in-law of Sigurðr Hlǫðvisson, Earl of Orkney, having married the latter's sister Hvarflǫð. Traditionally regarded as one of the most powerful Orcadian earls, Sigurðr appears to have extended his authority into the Isles in the late tenth century. Gilli apparently acted as Sigurðr's viceroy or tributary earl in the region. The time frame of Gilli's apparent authority in the Isles is uncertain, and may date as early as the reign of Guðrøðr Haraldsson, King of the Isles, or as late as the period following the death of this man's eventual successor, Rǫgnvaldr Guðrøðarson, King of the Isles. Gilli's name is probably Gaelic in origin, and he seems to have seated himself on either Coll or Colonsay, islands in the Inner Hebrides. It is possible that Gilli is identical to Gilla Ciaráin mac Glún Iairn, an Uí Ímair dynast who was slain at the Battle of Clontarf in 1014. If not, another possibility is that he was the father of a certain Conamal/Conmáel who was killed in 980.

Earl in the Hebrides

There is evidence to suggest that Sigurðr Hlǫðvisson, Earl of Orkney extended his authority from Orkney into the Isles in the late tenth- and early eleventh century. For instance, the thirteenth-century Njáls saga—the only source that specifically refers to Gilli—states that one of Sigurðr's followers, Kári Sǫlmundarson, extracted taxes from the northern Hebrides, then controlled by Gilli himself. Whether these taxes were due to Norwegian overlords of Sigurðr, as the saga states, is uncertain. The saga further declares that Sigurðr and his men defeated Guðrøðr Haraldsson, King of the Isles, after which they plundered the Isles. Also noted are additional assaults conducted by accomplices of Sigurðr throughout the Hebrides, Kintyre, Mann (against Guðrøðr), and Anglesey. The thirteenth-century Orkneyinga saga also reports Sigurðr's raids into the Isles, as does Eyrbyggja saga, a thirteenth-century source which further notes his taxation of the kingdom. Contemporary Orcadian expansion may be perceptible in the evidence of the land-assessment system of ouncelands in the Hebrides and along the western coast of Scotland. If Sigurðr's authority indeed stretched over the Isles in the last decades of the tenth century, such an intrusion could account for the numbers of silver hoards dating to this time.

This could in turn reveal that the aforesaid claims of continuous Orcadian conquests in the Isles—otherwise unrecorded outwith saga-tradition—give a less than unbiased account of events. Whatever the case, Guðrøðr was slain in 989, after which the political cohesion of Kingdom of the Isles—perhaps shaken by Orcadian encroachment in the 980s—seems to have diminished.

The extent of Guðrøðr's authority in the Hebrides is unknown due to his apparent coexistence with Gilli, and to the uncertainty of Orcadian encroachment. Guðrøðr's successor is likewise uncertain. On one hand, he may have been succeeded by his son, Rǫgnvaldr. Although it is conceivable that either Gilli or Sigurðr capitalised on Guðrøðr's death, and extended their overlordship as far south as Mann, possible after-effects such as these are uncorroborated. Although it is possible that Gilli controlled the Hebrides whilst Guðrøðr ruled Mann, the title accorded to the latter on his death could indicate otherwise. If so, the chronology of Gilli's subordination to Sigurðr may actually date to the period after Rǫgnvaldr's death in 1004/1005.

The saga also states that Gilli was married to Sigurðr's sister, Hvarflǫð. This marital alliance appears to further evince the southward extension of Sigurðr's influence. This union, along with the record of apparent amiable dealings with Sigurðr's associates, suggests that Gilli and Sigurðr indeed enjoyed close relations. The earl's family was clearly not averse to marrying into native dynasties, as Sigurðr's own mother was the daughter of an Irish king, whilst his wife was the daughter of a Scottish king. In fact, the aforesaid sources appear to indicate that Gilli operated in the Hebrides as a tributary earl to his brother-in-law. Certainly, Eyrbyggja saga states that Sigurðr left menn ("agents") in the Hebrides to collect tax from Mann, whilst Orkneyinga saga reveals that, at a later period in time, Sigurðr's son and successor, Þórfinnr Sigurðarson, Earl of Orkney, tasked a member of his own wife's family, Kálfr Árnason, to impose Orcadian authority in the Isles.

Clontarf, Gilla Ciaráin, and Conamal/Conmáel

By the end of the first decade of the eleventh century, the principal ruler in Ireland was Brian Bóruma mac Cennétig, High King of Ireland. Brian's daughter, Sláine, was married to Sitriuc mac Amlaíb, King of Dublin, whilst the latter's mother, Gormlaith ingen Murchada was a former wife of Brian. In 1013, Sitriuc allied himself to Brian's enemies, and revolted against Brian's overlordship. Although Brian proceeded to lay siege to Dublin—the only Viking town that participated in the revolt against his supremacy—Sitriuc retained possession of the settlement, and Brian retired to Munster for Christmas.

According to Njáls saga, Gilli and Sitriuc spent Yule with Sigurðr in Orkney, where Sitriuc convinced Sigurðr to ally himself against Brian on the condition that Sigurðr would gain Gormlaith in marriage. In April 1014, the opposing forces met and clashed at the remarkably bloody Battle of Clontarf. Although Brian's forces ultimately won the day, and Sigurðr himself was amongst the slain, Brian lost his life as well. As for Gilli, he appears in a chapter of Njáls saga that presents a series of supernatural events connected with the conflict. In one instance, a Caithnessman is said to have witnessed valkyrie-like apparitions singing songs for the slain, whilst a similar event is said to have occurred in the Faroe Islands. Priests in Iceland are stated to have encountered paranormal phenomena, whilst an Orcadian is said to have encountered the spectre of Sigurðr before disappearing off the face of the earth. Regarding Gilli, the saga asserts that he dreamt of a song that foretold the outcome of the battle and the fall of Brian and Sigurðr. There is reason to suspect that the aforesaid supernatural manifestations—arguably somewhat detached from the saga's general narrative—are actually interpolations of separate material. Elsewhere in the narrative, however, there are examples of paranormal phenomena intervening into human affairs. For example, the episode concerning Gilli's dream seems to directly parallel an earlier episode in which another man, the Icelander Flosi Þórðarson, is depicted dreaming of the burning of the saga's eponym, Njáll Þorgeirsson.

If the account of Gilli in the aftermath of Clontarf has been constructed for dramatic effect, the passage may not be evidence of his floruit beyond this point in history. In fact, it is possible that he is identical to Gilla Ciaráin mac Glún Iairn, a man who was amongst those slain at the battle. The Annals of Ulster, which records the latter's fall, styles him  ("heir-designate of the Foreigners"), revealing that Gilla Ciaráin was indeed a prominent man. Sitriuc is known to have had an elder brother named Glún Iairn, a man who had reigned as King of Dublin until his death in 989. If Gilla Ciaráin was a son of this king, his apparent tender age at the time of his father's death could account for Sitriuc's accession to the kingship. Furthermore, the aforesaid title accorded to Gilla Ciaráin appears to indicate that he was regarded as his uncle's royal heir. If Gilli and Gilla Ciaráin are indeed identical, his pre-eminent status in the Norse-Gaelic world would help to explain his marital alliance with Sigurðr.

Gilla Ciaráin's father bore a Gaelic name meaning "iron knee". Gilla Ciaráin's own name is Gaelic, meaning "the servant of Saint Ciarán". Gaelic names beginning with the initial name-element - first appear on record in last half of the tenth century. In fact, such a phenomenon may account for the name accorded to Gilli himself. Gilli's name suggests that he was at least partly of Gaelic descent, perhaps either Irish or Hebridean. Although various names are attributed to Gilli's wife in the numerous versions of Njáls saga, the best version of this source gives .

There may be further evidence concerning familial relations. In 980, Máel Sechnaill mac Domnaill, High King of Ireland utterly defeated Amlaíb Cuarán's forces at the Battle of Tara. One of the casualties of this remarkable conflict was a man identified as "" by the Annals of Ulster, and "" by the Annals of Tigernach. It is possible that these annal-entries refer to a man named Conamal or Conmáel, who was in turn the son of a man named Gilli, and that either the father or the son bore the title airrí Gall ("royal deputy of the Foreigners"). If correct, it is conceivable that this father is identical to Gilli himself. Against this identification, however, is the fact that the aforesaid saga-tradition depicts Gilli active at about the time of the Battle of Clontarf. The considerable span of time between the death of Conamal/Conmáel and this conflict may well be evidence that a paternal relationship between Conamal/Conmáel and Gilli is unlikely. Whatever the case, the sources appear to be confused as to whether the patronym refers to a personal name or a title. One possibility is that this confusion could indicate that the sources refer to both the personal name  and the epithet .

See also
Ásbjǫrn skerjablesi, a ninth-century Hebridean earl

Notes

Citations

References

Primary sources

Secondary sources

10th-century rulers of the Kingdom of the Isles
11th-century rulers of the Kingdom of the Isles
11th-century Irish people
11th-century Scottish people
Norse-Gaels
People from Coll
Rulers of the Kingdom of the Isles
Uí Ímair